Risk Management is a magazine dedicated to issues of interest to practicing risk managers.  It is published by the Risk and Insurance Management Society.

The editor-in-chief is Morgan O'Rourke.

References

External links 
 

Business magazines published in the United States
Magazines with year of establishment missing
Magazines published in New York City